Frederick Willder (born 20 March 1944) is an English footballer who played as an inside forward in the Football League for Chester. He then enjoyed a long career at Northern Premier League club Fleetwood F.C. before moving to Wigan Athletic in 1971.

References

Chester City F.C. players
Blackpool F.C. players
Fleetwood Town F.C. players
English Football League players
Association football inside forwards
1944 births
Living people
People from Lytham St Annes
English footballers